Jean-Louis Martin (born 20 August 1939) is a French equestrian. He competed in two events at the 1968 Summer Olympics.

References

1939 births
Living people
French male equestrians
Olympic equestrians of France
Equestrians at the 1968 Summer Olympics
Sportspeople from Landes (department)